James F. McCarthy (born  1949) is a sociologist and former president of Suffolk University in Boston, Massachusetts.

McCarthy received an A.B. in sociology from the College of the Holy Cross in Worcester, Massachusetts in 1971, an M.A. in sociology from Indiana University in 1972, and a Ph.D. in sociology from Princeton University in 1977 after completing a doctoral dissertation titled "Patterns of marriage dissolution in the United States." McCarthy served as a professor and dean of the School of Health and Human Services at the University of New Hampshire, and has taught courses in public health and sociology at Columbia University and the Johns Hopkins University. His academic expertise is demography and adolescent and reproductive health.  From 2007 to 2012 McCarthy served as provost and senior vice president for academic affairs at the City University of New York's Baruch College, McCarthy was selected as the president of Suffolk University in 2012.

References

Princeton University alumni
College of the Holy Cross alumni
Indiana University alumni
American sociologists
Sociology educators
Presidents of Suffolk University
1949 births
Living people